Nuofu Township is a township in Lancang Lahu Autonomous County, Yunnan, China.

Administrative division
As of 2016, the township is divided into nine villages: 
Nuofu
Gede
Amuga
Dongmengsong
Bakanai
Luomeng
Nanduan
Wanka
Ali

History
In the Qing dynasty (1644–1911), it came under the jurisdiction of Menglian Xuanfusi.

In 1940, it belonged to the 2nd District. That same year, the 2nd District was revoked. The Menghai Township and Zhenbian Township were set up.

After the founding of the Communist State in 1949, Zhenbian District was set up. It was renamed "Nuofu District" in 1954. During the Great Leap Forward, its name was changed to "Qianwei Commune" in 1969 and then "Nuofu Commune" in 1971. It was incorporated as a township in 1988.

Geography
It lies at the southern of Lancang Lahu Autonomous County, bordering Menglian Dai, Lahu and Va Autonomous County to the west, Myanmar to the south, Donghui Town and Jiujing Hani Ethnic Township to the north, and Huimin Town to the east.

The major rivers and streams are Nanla River, Nanli River, and Nanmen River.

Economy
The principal industries in the area are agriculture, forestry and animal husbandry. Commercial crops include tea, natural rubber, sugarcane, coffee bean, and fruit.

Demographics

As of 2017, the National Bureau of Statistics of China estimates the township's population now to be 17,556.

Tourist attractions
The Nuofu Christian Church is a church in the township. It has been listed among the third group of provincial level cultural heritage by Yunnan government in 1987.

References

Bibliography

Townships of Pu'er City
Divisions of Lancang Lahu Autonomous County